Khaslu (also Romanized as Khāşlū and Khāşşelū) is a village in Teymurlu Rural District, Gugan District, Azarshahr County, East Azerbaijan Province, Iran. At the 2006 census, its population was 975, in 283 families.

References 

Populated places in Azarshahr County